Deborah Lynn Friedman (February 23, 1951 – January 9, 2011) was an American singer-songwriter of Jewish religious songs and melodies. She is best known for her setting of "Mi Shebeirach", the prayer for healing, which is used by hundreds of congregations across America. Her songs are used by some Orthodox Jewish congregations, as well as non-Orthodox Jewish congregations. Friedman was a feminist, and Orthodox Jewish feminist Blu Greenberg noted that while Friedman's music impacted most on Reform and Conservative liturgy, "she had a large impact [in] Modern Orthodox shuls, women’s tefillah [prayer], the Orthodox feminist circles.... She was a religious bard and angel for the entire community."

Biography
The daughter of Freda and Gabriel Friedman, Debbie was born in New York. From age five, she was raised in Minnesota. She wrote many of her early songs as a song leader at the overnight camp Olin Sang Ruby Union Institute in Oconomowoc, Wisconsin, in the early 1970s. Between 1971 and 2010, she recorded 22 albums. Her work was inspired by such diverse sources as Joan Baez, Peter, Paul and Mary, and a number of other folk music artists. Friedman employed both English and Hebrew lyrics and wrote for all ages. Some of her songs are "The Aleph Bet Song," "Miriam's Song," and the songs "Not By Might" and "I am a Latke." She also performed in synagogues and concert halls.

Friedman suffered since the 1990s from a neurological condition, with effects apparently similar to multiple sclerosis. The story of her music, as well as the challenges she faced in living with illness, were featured in a 2004 documentary film about Friedman called A Journey of Spirit, produced by Ann Coppel, which followed her from 1997 to 2002.

In 2007, Friedman accepted an appointment to the faculty of Hebrew Union College-Jewish Institute of Religion's School of Sacred Music in New York (now called the Debbie Friedman School of Sacred Music) where she instructed both rabbinic and cantorial students.

In 2010, she was named to the Forward 50 after the release of her 22nd album As You Go On Your Way: Shacharit – The Morning Prayers.

Friedman was a known lesbian, but did not talk about it in public. Her obituary in The New York Times was the first place her sexual identity was publicized.

Death and legacy
She was admitted to a Mission Viejo, California Hospital in January 2011, where she died January 9, 2011, from pneumonia.

Rabbi David Ellenson, then-President of Hebrew Union College-Jewish Institute of Religion, announced on January 27, 2011, that the Hebrew Union College-Jewish Institute of Religion's School of Sacred Music would be renamed the Debbie Friedman School of Sacred Music. On December 7, 2011, it was officially renamed as such.

In 2014, the book Sing Unto God: The Debbie Friedman Anthology was published; it features "every song she wrote and recorded (plus more than 30 songs previously unavailable) in lead sheet format, with complete lyrics, melody line, guitar chords, Hebrew, transliteration, and English translation."

Among her music that remains the most sung in North American Jewish communities include her "Mi Shebeirach" (co-written with her partner Drorah Setel), "Miriam's Song" and her Havdalah melody.

Discography

Studio albums 
 Sing Unto God (1972)
 Not by Might Not by Power (1974)
 Ani Ma-Amin (1976)
 If Not Now, When? (1980)
 ...And The Youth Shall See Visions (1981)
 And You Shall Be a Blessing.... (1989)
 Debbie Friedman: Live at the Del (1990)
 The World of Your Dreams (1993)
 Miracles & Wonders (1995)
 Shirim Al Galgalim: Songs on Wheels (1995)
 Shanah Tovah: A Good Year (1996)
 Renewal of Spirit (1997)
 The Journey Continues: Ma'yan Passover Haggadah In Song (1997)
 It's You (1998)
 The Alef Bet (2001)
 The Water in the Well (2001)
 Light These Lights: Debbie Friedman Sings Chanukah Songs For The Whole Family (2003)
 One People (2006)
 As You Go On Your Way: Shacharit – The Morning Prayers (2008)

Live albums 

 Debbie Friedman: Live at the Del (1990)
 At Carnegie Hall (1996)

Compilations 

 In The Beginning (1994)
 Songs of the Spirit - The Debbie Friedman Anthology (2005)

Affiliations
Friedman was a 1969 alumna of Highland Park High School in Saint Paul, Minnesota. She was inducted into the school's Hall of Fame in 1999. She was also an honorary member of the American Conference of Cantors.

References

External links
Debbie Friedman website
Jewish Women and the Feminist Revolution from the Jewish Women's Archive
A Journey of Spirit
Debbie Friedman Tributes Page (URJ)

1951 births
2011 deaths
American women singer-songwriters
American feminists
Feminist musicians
Deaths from pneumonia in California
Hebrew Union College – Jewish Institute of Religion faculty
Jewish American songwriters
American lesbian musicians
American LGBT singers
American LGBT songwriters
LGBT people from Minnesota
Lesbian singers
Lesbian songwriters
Musicians from Utica, New York
Musicians from Saint Paul, Minnesota
People from Mission Viejo, California
Lesbian Jews
Jewish folk singers
American women academics
20th-century American LGBT people
21st-century American LGBT people
21st-century American Jews
21st-century American women singers
21st-century American singers
Singer-songwriters from New York (state)
Singer-songwriters from California
Singer-songwriters from Minnesota
American lesbian writers